The Tour de Wallonie is a stage race cycling race on the UCI Europe Tour. It runs in Wallonia, the French-speaking part of Belgium in the end of July. Between 1974 and 1995 it was reserved to amateurs. Since 2005, the race has been organized as a 2.HC event on the UCI Europe Tour. The race became part of the UCI ProSeries in 2020.

Winners

References

External links
  

 
UCI Europe Tour races
Cycle races in Belgium
Recurring sporting events established in 1994
1994 establishments in Belgium
Sport in Wallonia